Majdalena is a municipality and village in Jindřichův Hradec District in the South Bohemian Region of the Czech Republic. It has about 500 inhabitants.

Notable people
Jiří Havlis (1932–2010), rower, Olympic champion

References

Villages in Jindřichův Hradec District